The Psychedelic Furs is the debut studio album by English rock band the Psychedelic Furs, released on 7 March 1980 by Columbia Records. It was reissued with bonus tracks in 2002 by Columbia/Legacy. In 2020, Rolling Stone included the band's debut studio album in their "80 Greatest albums of 1980" list, praising the musicians for sounding like "a grand art project".

The original UK LP had nine tracks. The US LP contained 10 tracks, deleting one track from the UK LP ("Blacks/Radio") and adding two others ("Susan's Strange" and "Soap Commercial"), and changing the order of the tracks significantly. The CD reissue contained 13 tracks, beginning with the original nine UK LP tracks (programmed in their original order), then adding the two additional tracks from the US LP release, plus a version of "Mack the Knife" and a demo of the album track "Flowers".

Track listing
All songs were written and arranged by the Psychedelic Furs, with words by Richard Butler, and produced by Steve Lillywhite, except where noted.

Original UK LP
Side 1
"India" – 6:21
"Sister Europe" – 5:38
"Imitation of Christ" – 5:28
"Fall" – 2:40
"Pulse" – 2:37 (produced by Howard Thompson, Ian Taylor and the Psychedelic Furs)
Side 2
"We Love You" – 3:26 (produced by Howard Thompson, Ian Taylor and the Psychedelic Furs)
"Wedding Song" – 4:19
"Blacks/Radio" – 6:56
"Flowers" – 4:10 (produced by Howard Thompson, Ian Taylor and the Psychedelic Furs)

Original US LP
Side 1
"India" – 6:21
"Sister Europe" – 5:38
"Susan's Strange" – 3:13 (produced by Martin Hannett)
"Fall" – 2:40
"We Love You" – 3:26 (produced by Howard Thompson, Ian Taylor and the Psychedelic Furs)
Side 2
"Soap Commercial" – 2:53 (produced by Martin Hannett)
"Imitation of Christ" – 5:28
"Pulse" – 2:37 (produced by Howard Thompson, Ian Taylor and the Psychedelic Furs)
"Wedding Song" – 4:19
"Flowers" – 4:10 (produced by Howard Thompson, Ian Taylor and the Psychedelic Furs)

CD reissue
"India" – 6:21
"Sister Europe" – 5:38
"Imitation of Christ" – 5:28
"Fall" – 2:40
"Pulse" – 2:37 (produced by Howard Thompson, Ian Taylor and the Psychedelic Furs)
"We Love You" – 3:26 (produced by Howard Thompson, Ian Taylor and the Psychedelic Furs)
"Wedding Song" – 4:19
"Blacks/Radio" – 6:56
"Flowers" – 4:10 (produced by Howard Thompson, Ian Taylor and the Psychedelic Furs)
"Susan's Strange" – 3:13 (produced by Martin Hannett)
"Soap Commercial" – 2:53 (produced by Martin Hannett)
"Mack the Knife" (Kurt Weill, Bertolt Brecht, Marc Blitzstein) – 4:18 (produced by the Psychedelic Furs)
"Flowers" (Demo) – 5:36 (produced by the Psychedelic Furs)

Personnel
The Psychedelic Furs
Richard Butler – lead and background vocals
John Ashton – guitar
Tim Butler – bass guitar
Vince Ely – drums
Roger Morris – guitar
Duncan Kilburn – saxophones

Technical
Howard Thompson – executive producer
Phil Thornalley – engineer
Steve Lillywhite – producer

Chart performance
Album

Singles

References

External links

The Psychedelic Furs albums
1980 debut albums
Albums produced by Steve Lillywhite
Albums produced by Martin Hannett
Columbia Records albums